The 1929–30 Penn Quakers men's ice hockey season was the 13th season of play for the program.

Season
Penn revived its ice hockey program and announced the team's schedule in early December. With new coach Normand Shay, a former NHL player, in charge of the program, there was hope that the team could do well despite several years of inactivity. To entice the potential fans even more was the skill of the freshman team which was supposed to make the Quakers viable in the coming years. The sport was reinstituted on a provision basis, however, and would only survive if this season if the university's Council of Athletics agreed to continue the program.

The team opened its season on the 11th of December and, while their loss was unsurprising, the magnitude of the defeat was a bit hard to swallow. the team was walloped 12–0 and would need to improve quickly if they wanted to compete with their contemporaries. One of the biggest issues for the club was the lack of conditioning that saw them flag badly in the later half of each period. Unfortunately, the team had little time to get better before their next game and fell 3–19 to a very strong Princeton team. In spite of the lopsided score, Penn showed some life late by scoring their three goals in the later half of the match.

A rematch with the Tigers awaited the team after the Christmas break and coach Shay left his starting lineup unchanged. While the Quakers lost the rematch, they nearly halved the number of goals they allowed, demonstrating significant improvement during the previous month. The team had a short turnaround before the next game and welcomed Boston College to Philadelphia for the first meeting between the two programs. While Penn lost again, the margin of their defeats continued to fall and the improved play of goaltender Goodman held their opponents to 6 goals on 33 shots.

Continued improvement put Penn closer to their first win of the season and they were within striking distance of Brown for much of their next match. The following game came against possibly the best team in the country when Yale arrived to revive the programs' rivalry. Yale ended up winning the game in dominating fashion, though Penn was missing one of its regular defensemen in Oldham.

Nearing the halfway point of their season, the Quakers had yet to win a game. However, excluding the Yale game, the team had produced better results each game and were progressing well with the training they received from coach Shay. The final game before the team paused for semester examinations was against the Pennsylvania Athletic Club and led by former Quaker player and coach, George Orton. It would turn out to be the final game behind the bench for Shay as he was replaced by Percy Fynan. The first game under Fynan was a debacle as the team was solidly defeated 1–9 but the team was getting used to their new coach as well as a new lineup. Captain O'Reilly had been shifted to wing while new addition Jim Holland was installed at center. The Quakers weren't able to improve on their first meeting with BC, mainly due to a lack of teamwork.

Two more losses followed in which the Quakers couldn't manage a goal but then coach Fynan had time to teach his men a new system. When the Quakers entered the game against a mediocre MIT they knew it was probably their best chance to win all season. Penn took an early lead, but soon found themselves behind. Goodman held MIT back for the remainder of the game and allowed Penn to score twice more to earn their first victory of the year. The program had one final game to play and closed out the year with a 3–1 win over Rensselaer.

The success at the end of the year convinced the athletic department to bring the team back for the following year.

Roster

Standings

Schedule and Results

|-
!colspan=12 style=";" | Regular Season

† Most records erroneously have the game recorded as being played on January 10, when it was originally scheduled to be held.

References

Penn Quakers men's ice hockey seasons
Penn
Penn
Penn
Penn